The Children's Midsummer Night's Dream is a 2001 film based on the play A Midsummer Night's Dream by William Shakespeare. It was written and directed by Christine Edzard and produced by Olivier Stockman. The music by Michel Sanvoisin was performed by the Goldsmiths Youth Orchestra, conducted by Eli Corp. The film features Jamie Peachey, John Heyfron, Danny Bishop, Jessica Fowler and Leane Lyson.

Production 
A Children's Midsummer Night's Dream was made with a cast of 364 children, aged between 8 and 12,  from 8 primary schools in Rotherhithe, east London. Shot on a very low budget, the film was made at Sands Films studios, the converted docklands warehouse where Edzard directed the  1987 film Little Dorrit. Many of the children who formed the cast, all non-professional actors, came from the North Peckham estate where 10-year old Damilola Taylor was fatally stabbed during production,  just a stone's throw from Sands studios.

This event drew the world's attention to some of the estates of Southwark, their abandonment and lack of government funding and resources, and associated crime levels. However, Sands' film project, which “acquainted a multiracial group of inner-city schoolchildren with Shakespeare” was turned down by the Arts Council for lottery funding, despite the council's stated aims to “support and encourage cultural diversity and social inclusiveness”.

The Arts Council's decision was upheld later in the year by its successor the British Film Council who complained that the project was “not sufficiently creative.” The Sands team funded the project from savings, while the film's producer Olivier Stockman pointed out that “Kenneth Branagh can get £1 million to do Shakespeare but kids from Southwark cannot get anything.” 

This led to the stalling of the film during post-production. According to Stockman, the Arts Council's decision was made on political, rather than artistic, terms and was affected by the political nature of the film – for example the decision by director Edzard not to recruit the children through an acting agency.

Edzard and production co-ordinator Annabel Hands said they preferred to use untrained children with “no preconceptions”. The cast of children learnt new skills and improved their self-esteem, and “not one child dropped out during the six-month shoot.” Edzard explained that these were children who had “potential and curiosity” but “were were not being offered anything” and were hence “cut off from reality”.

Edzard's approach to A Children's Midsummer Night's Dream has been described as “finding specifically childlike concerns” in Shakespeare's play, rather than "mobilising it" for older audiences. The casting of children represents “an event unique in Shakespearean cinematic history” but also recaptures the audience's understanding of the playwright's “wonder and invention” as the young cast members appropriate the theme of Shakespeare's original to "match the considerations of their own experience."The Children's Midsummer Night's Dream advances the bold, albeit less obviously social, engagement with “social malfeance and urban ills” which animated Edzard, her husband Richard Goodwin and producer Stockman's earlier film projects Little Dorrit (1987), The Fool (1989) and As You Like It (1991 film). 

Because the age of the actors makes them incompatible with "the play's focus on marriage, sexuality, and domestic power”, Edzard's project is of interest for studies of gender and gender politics, as well as of cultural authority.

The film uses Shakespeare's complete text, as well as elaborate costumes and “intricately and properly scaled sets” created in the studio.

Reception 

Writing in the Literature/ Film Quarterly journal, Mark Thornton Burnett describes The Children's Midsummer Night's Dream as “a wonderful achievement” by director Christine Edzard, who has “established herself as a significant voice in the reinterpretation of classic writers”.  

The Radio Times was generally positive, praising the “charming puppet theatre” and the “quaintly contrived woodland nooks” of the film's set and describing it as “the best school production you're ever likely to see.” Although they thought that the film “lacked immediacy” and  the children's non-professional acting style was “the main problem”, they concluded that its “honesty and homely ingenuity” made it “an impossible film to dislike.” 

Some  reviewers were more ambivalent. BBC Film Reviews, while understanding the director's decision to tap into the “self-consciousness, directness, and enthusiasm” of “ordinary schoolkids”, complained that the young actors were “of decidedly mixed abilities”, sometimes faltering in delivery or using a “wrong emphasis”, and, as children, were not able to “carry...the soul of Shakespeare's adult characters”. At the same time, the reviewer praised the film's “charm, perkiness and photography (which does capture the mystery and magic)”, as well as the film's structure which sees the children “immersed in watching a puppet version of the play, actually enter the play, becoming characters themselves.”

References

External links 
 
 

Films based on A Midsummer Night's Dream
2001 films